Andrea Kane is an American author of romance novels and suspense novels. She has resided in the Martinsville section of Bridgewater Township, New Jersey, United States, with her husband Brad and daughter Wendi.

Bibliography

Single novels
 Dream Castle (July 1992)
 Masque of Betrayal (June 1993)
 Emerald Garden (January 1996)
 The Music Box (March 1998)
 Run For Your Life (November 2000)
 No Way Out (November 2001)
 Scent of Danger (February 2003)
 I'll Be Watching You (January 2006)
 Wrong place, wrong time (July 2008)

Barrett Family series
 My Heart's Desire (October 1991)
 Samantha (December 1994)

Kingsley in Love series
 Echoes in the Mist (February 1994)
 Wishes in the Wind (August 1996)

Black Diamond series
 Legacy of the Diamond (February 1997)
 The Black Diamond (November 1997)

Thornton-Bromleigh Family series
 The Last Duke (June 1995)
 "Yuletide Treasure" in A Gift of Love (November 1996)
 The Theft (October 1998)

Colby's Coin series
 The Gold Coin (August 1999)
 The Silver Coin (September 1999)

Sloane Burbank series
 Twisted (August 2009)
 Drawn in Blood (September 2009)

Peter "Monty" Montgomery series
 Wrong Place, Wrong Time (March 2007)
 Dark Room (April 2007)

Forensic Instincts Suspense novel series
 The Girl Who Disappeared Twice (May 2012)
 The Line Between Here and Gone (June 2012)
 The Stranger You Know (September 2013)
 The Silence That Speaks (April 2015)
 The Murder That Never Was (May 2016)
 A Face to Die For (September 2017)

Anthologies in collaboration
 "Yuletide Treasure" in A Gift of Love (November 1996) (with Judith McNaught, Jude Deveraux, Kimberly Cates and Judith O'Brien)
 "Stone Cold" in Wait Until Dark (May 2001) (with Linda Anderson, Karen Robards and Mariah Stewart)

See also

 List of romantic novelists

References

Sources
 Andrea Kane's Official Homepage
 Andrea Kane in FantasticFiction

20th-century American novelists
21st-century American novelists
American romantic fiction writers
American women novelists
Living people
People from Bridgewater Township, New Jersey
Year of birth missing (living people)
Place of birth missing (living people)
20th-century American women writers
21st-century American women writers